Johnny Johnston (31 May 1913 - 4 October 1994) was a Scotland international rugby union player.

Rugby Union career

Amateur career

Johnston played for Cambridge University and then Richmond.

Provincial career

He played for the Scotland Possibles side against the Scotland Probables side in the final trial match of the 1937-38 season to determine international selection. He scored a try in a 23-13 win for the Possibles side.

International career

He was capped 5 times for Scotland, between 1935 to 1937.

References

1913 births
1994 deaths
Scottish rugby union players
Scotland international rugby union players
Scotland Possibles players
Cambridge University R.U.F.C. players
Richmond F.C. players
Rugby union players from London
Rugby union wings